NX-OS is a network operating system for the Nexus-series Ethernet switches and MDS-series Fibre Channel storage area network switches made by Cisco Systems.  It evolved from the Cisco operating system SAN-OS, originally developed for its MDS switches.

It is based on Wind River Linux and is inter-operable with other Cisco operating systems. The command-line interface of NX-OS is similar to that of Cisco IOS.

Recent NX-OS has both Cisco-style CLI and Bash shell available. On NX-OS 7.0(3)I3, the output from uname with the -a command line argument might look like the text below:
$ uname -a
Linux version 3.4.91-WR5.0.1.13_standard+ (divvenka@sjc-ads-7035) (gcc version 4.6.3 (Wind River Linux Sourcery CodeBench 4.6-60) ) #1 SMP Tue Feb 6 12:43:13 PST 2018

Core features 
 System Manager (sysmgr)
 Persistent Storage Service (PSS)
 Message & Transaction Services (MTS)

Additional features 
 Fibre Channel and FICON
 FCIP
 FCoE (Nexus 5000/7000 linecards)
 iSCSI
 IPsec
 Scheduling
 NPIV NX Port ID Virtualization
 Inter–VSAN Routing
 VSAN
 Zoning (Hard zoning)
 Callhome
 Cisco Fabric Services (distributed configuration)
 SSH and Telnet
 Storage Media Encryption
 Port Channels
 Cisco Data Mobility Manager
 Fibre Channel Write Acceleration

Switches running NX-OS 
 Nexus B22 (HP, Dell, Fujitsu)
 Nexus 9000 series
 Nexus 7700 series
 Nexus 7000 series
 Nexus 6000 series
 Nexus 5000 series
 Nexus 4000 (for IBM BladeCenter)
 Nexus 2000 series
 Nexus 3000
 Nexus 1000V
 MDS 9700 FC Directors
 MDS 9500 FC Directors
 MDS 9250i FC Switch
 MDS 9222i FC Switch
 MDS 9100 FC Switches

Differences between IOS and NX-OS 

 NX-OS does not support the login command to switch users.
 NX-OS does not distinguish between standard or extended access lists, all lists are named and "extended" in functionality.
 NX-OS did not support scp server prior to 5.1(1) release.
 In NX-OS, there is no "write" command to save the configuration like on IOS (one uses the "copy" command, instead).  Instead, command aliases can be created to provide the "write" command.
 When accessing NX-OS, users authenticate directly to their assigned privilege level.
 SSH server is enabled while Telnet server is disabled by default in NX-OS.

Releases 
4.1, 4.2, 5.0, 5.1, 5.2, 6.0, 6.1, 6.2, 7.0, 9.2, 9.3, 10.1

See also 
 Cisco IOS
 Cisco IOS XE
 Cisco IOS XR
 FTOS – competitor Force10's operating system FTOS

References

External links 
 Cisco Content Hub
 Cisco Feature Navigator
 intro
 data sheet

Proprietary operating systems
Network operating systems
Cisco software